Cefatrizine is a broad-spectrum cephalosporin antibiotic.

References 

Cephalosporin antibiotics
Triazoles
Phenols
Acetamides